Zeta Psi was founded June 1, 1847, as a social college fraternity. The organization now comprises 53 active chapters and 34 inactive chapters, encompassing roughly 50,000 brothers, across the United States and Canada. Fraternity members have distinguished themselves in a wide range of professional fields, including government service, the military, literature and the entertainment industry. Following is a select list of notable members of Zeta Psi by field.

Academics and researchers

Business

Entertainment

Law

Military

Philanthropy

Politics

Governors

Federal Senators

Federal Representatives

Federal cabinet

Mayors of major cities

Sports

Baseball

American football

Golf

Olympic medalists

Tennis

Writers and journalists

Notes 
† Duly initiated honorary member

Phi Alphas 
The Phi Alpha is the leader of the international chapter of the Zeta Psi Fraternity.

* Deceased chapter (Do not confuse chapters)

References 

Zeta Psi
brothers